Arthur Walter Tyler (July 26, 1915 – August 23, 2008) was an American bobsledder who competed in the late 1950s. He won a bronze medal in the four-man event at the 1956 Winter Olympics in Cortina d'Ampezzo.

Tyler also won four medals at the FIBT World Championships with one gold (Four-man: 1959), one silver (1957), and two bronzes (Two-man: 1959, Four-man: 1957).

References
Bobsleigh four-man Olympic medalists for 1924, 1932-56, and since 1964
Bobsleigh two-man world championship medalists since 1931
Bobsleigh four-man world championship medalists since 1930

1915 births
2008 deaths
American male bobsledders
Bobsledders at the 1956 Winter Olympics
Olympic bronze medalists for the United States in bobsleigh
Medalists at the 1956 Winter Olympics